Heard It Through the Grapevine is a 2015 South Korean television series starring Yoo Jun-sang, Yoo Ho-jeong, Go Ah-sung, and Lee Joon. It aired on SBS from February 23 to June 2, 2015 on Mondays and Tuesdays at 21:55 for 30 episodes.

Plot
Heard It Through the Grapevine is a black comedy that satirizes the way of life of Korea's upper class, who wield enormous power and thrive on inherited wealth and lineage.

Han Jeong-ho (Yoo Jun-sang), and Choi Yeon-hee (Yoo Ho-jeong), are a wealthy couple from a prestigious family. Their reputation is suddenly turned upside down because their teenage son, Han In-sang (Lee Joon), impregnates his girlfriend from an ordinary family, Seo Bom (Go Ah-sung). Bom is determined to endure being isolated from her own family and humiliation from her in-laws for the sake of her child's future, while In-sang struggles between his love for Bom and his family's high expectations.

Cast

Main characters
Yoo Jun-sang as Han Jeong-ho (47)
The patriarch of the Han family, a prestigious and wealthy clan which for generations has produced many highly respected and successful lawyers who've influenced South Korea's politics and economy. Like his predecessors, Jeong-ho is strict and a perfectionist.

Yoo Ho-jeong as Choi Yeon-hee (45)
Jeong-ho's beautiful, elegant and intelligent socialite wife. She secretly knows that her son feels burdened and pressured to live up to his family's expectations, but has never spoken up about it.

Lee Joon as Han In-sang (18)
Jeong-ho and Yeon-hee's son. In-sang has received the best education and upbringing that money can buy. On the surface he seems like a perfect boy, but he actually feels pressured by his family and peers. Even though Bom told him not to meet her again, his love for her makes him break his promise.

Go Ah-sung as Seo Bom (18)
The second-eldest daughter of an ordinary family living in a poor neighborhood. She is determined to have a better future, therefore she strives hard in her studies. Smart, popular, and well-spoken, she was chosen to attend a prestigious English camp, where she meets and falls in love with Han In-sang.

Supporting characters
Jang Hyun-sung as Seo Hyeong-shik (47)
Yoon Bok-in as Kim Jin-ae (45)
Gong Seung-yeon as Seo Noo-ri (22)
Ye Soo-jung as Joo-young's mother
Joo Min-kyung as Noo-ri's colleague
Jeon Suk-chan as Seo Chul-shik (43)
Park So-young as Han Yi-ji (16)
Baek Ji-yeon as Ji Young-ra (45)
Jang Ho-il as Song Jae-won (45)
Kim Ho-jung as Uhm So-jeong (45)
Seo Jeong-yeon as Lee Seon-sook (43)
Lee Sun-joo as Hong Geum-yeon (60) 
Gil Hae-yeon as Yang Jae-hwa (53)
Jang So-yeon as Min Joo-young (29)
Lee Hwa-ryong as Kim Tae-woo (35)
Park Jin-young as Baek Dae-hun (60)
Baek Ji-won as Yoo Shin-young (37)
Kim Kwon as Yoon Je-hoon (26)
Jung Yoo-jin as Jang Hyun-soo (18)
Kim Jung-young as Jung-soon (55)
Jung Ga-ram as Sung Min-jae (18)
Kim Hak-sun as Butler Park (58)

Ratings

Awards and nominations

Notes

References

External links
 

Korean-language television shows
2015 South Korean television series debuts
2015 South Korean television series endings
Seoul Broadcasting System television dramas
South Korean comedy-drama television series
Television series by Pan Entertainment